Tamil cuisine is a culinary style originating in the southern Indian state of Tamil Nadu and other countries of South Asia like Sri Lanka. Meats, along with rice, legumes, and lentils, are also popular. Dairy products and tamarind are used to provide sour flavors. On special occasions, traditional Tamil dishes are served in a traditional manner, using banana leaves in place of utensils. After eating, the banana leaves are then used as a secondary food for cattle. A typical breakfast meal consists of idli or dosa with chutney. Lunch includes rice, sambar, curd, kuzhambu, and rasam.

Typical meals

 (a typical meal), along with other Tamil dishes are served on a banana leaf (vaazhai illai), which adds flavor. Puddings such as payasam are eaten first. Coffee and tea are the staple drinks.

"Virundhu" refers to the core elements of Tamil cuisine offered to the guests on special occasions such as festivals and marriage ceremony. Rice staples, tomato rice, Paruppu, sambar, rasam, kuzhambu, poriyal and koottu are added with buttermilk or curd to prepare pachadi. Dry and fresh fruits or vegetables are also used to prepare traditional cuisine. They serve salt, pickles, vada, payasam, appalam and aviyal. After the meal, a banana and a betel leaf (paan) with areca nuts and limestone paste are served to promote digestion. Before eating traditional cuisine, people clean the banana leaf with water. It is used as a large dining table sheet to serve food for guests and family members on which the food items are placed.

Regional cuisine

Each area where Tamils have lived has developed its own distinct variant of the common dishes. The four divisions of ancient Tamilakam prepare their unique Tamil cuisine.

Chola Nadu
The cuisine of the Chola Nadu region specializes in several dishes such as sevai and other varieties associated with different sauces like chutney. The most common dishes are from Chidambaram. Kumbakonam is famous for its filter coffee. The Thanjavur region is one of the prominent producers of rice-based dishes like puliyodharai, sambar sadham, vegetable rice and podi sadham. Millet dishes like kutharai vali dosai are also prepared. Freshwater fish from the area of Thiruchirapalli are famous for their unique taste.

Pandiya Nadu
The Chettinad region and its adjoining areas such as Karaikudi are famous for its typical spicy cuisine also known as chettinad cuisine. Dishes like idiyappam, uthappam, paniyaram as well as meat dishes are common in this region. The Madurai region has its own unique dishes such as Muttaiparotta, Paruthipal, Karidosai, Jasmine Idli, Irameen Kuzhambu and it is the place of origin of the milk dessert Jigarthanda. Non vegetarian dishes from Chettinad and Madurai are one of the most renowned among the South Indians. The Virudhunagar region is famous for the Coin Parotta. Unlike the traditional way of preparation, Coin Parotta is generally deep fried in oil and served with Mutton gravy.

Kongu Nadu
Kongu Nadu cuisine was originally prepared in rural areas. Oputtu, Sandahai and Kola urundai are few among the main dishes. Many dishes in Kongu Nadu are based on Coconut and Onions as there is an abundant supply of Coconut, Onions and Groundnuts. Thengai paal jaggery, Ulundu Kali, Kachayam, Arisimparupu sadam, Kelvaragu Puttumavu, Arisi Puttumavu, Paniyaram, Kelvaragu Pakoda, Thengai barbi, Kadalai urundai, Ellu urundai and Pori urundai are among other dishes prepared by Tamil people. They consume Mutton, Chicken, Freshwater fishes and Quail due to the area being landlocked. Arisimparupu sadam is a unique dish. Most common oils are sesame and groundnut oil. Coconut oil is used for main cooking and as well as seasoning in certain Kongu Nadu dishes.

Tondaimandalam
The cuisine of this regions shares similarities with Telugu cuisine due to geographic proximity. Hot and spicy vegetarian and non-vegetarian dishes are prepared. Idli, dosai, bhajji, koottu, murukku, vada curry and chicken 65 are common dishes in this region.

Tamil culinary terms in English
 "Curry" comes from the Tamil word kari.
 The Tamil phrase milagu thanneer refers to "pepper soup", literally pepper water or mulligatawny
 "Congee" is derived from the Tamil word kanji.

Dishes

Rice is the staple food of most Tamil people. It is generally eaten during lunch and sometimes dinner. Soru is served along with other food items such as sambar, poriyal, rasam, kootu, Keerai and curd.

Breakfast dishes

Main dishes
 Idli is a steamed rice-cake prepared with fermented batter or rice and black gram. It is usually served with different kinds of traditional dishes such as chutney, sambhar or vadacurry.
 Dosai is prepared from a fermented batter and black gram with a small quantity of sambar or chutney. Several varieties like saada dosai, kal dosai, muttai dosai, neer dosai, rava dosai and paasi paruppu dosai are prominently available in Tamil Nadu.
 Vadai is based on the ingredients used and served along with idlis.
 Pongal is a traditional cuisine where rice is cooked in a matki with water and milk. The word (pongal) directly translates to the action of boiling over the container due to the starch.
 Paniyaram is a dumpling shaped dish made using dosa batter.
 Appam is prepared with a fermented batter of rice and black gram mixture. Appam generally has thin corners with a soft center.
 Uthappam is a dosa-based dish that is slightly thick, fluffy, and soft. It can be made from regular idli/dosai batter.
 Puttu is a steamed, layered, cylindrical cake made from flour or rice.
 Kozhakkattai is a steamed dumpling made with rice flour.
 Sevai or idiyappam are rice noodles usually in steamed rice cakes.
 Adai is prepared with a mixtures of lentils. It contains fiber and calcium. It is used as a recipe by the Tamil people.

Side dishes
 Sambar is a lentil-based vegetable stew or chowder made with tamarind, broth and freshly grounded spices.
 Chutney varieties consumed by the people are coconut chutney, onion chutney, tomato chutney, coriander chutney, kara chutney, garlic chutney and puli chutney.
 Vada curry is a classic dish that is also famous among Chennai people.
 Thovaiyal is a wet ground paste that contains several ingredients.
 Sambal is condiment mostly accompanied for rice, string hoppers and hoppers in Tamil parts of Srilanka. 
 Sodhi is a coconut milk based dish best made for hoppers and string hoppers in Tamil parts of Srilanka.

Drinks
Kaapi is the most popular beverage. Its preparation is generally done with gourmet coffee beans. The preparation of filter coffee is a ritual. Sometimes chicory is added to enhance the aroma. Hot milk with sugar and a small quantity of decoction is then served in a tumbler set, a traditional coffee cup.
Koozh is also known as Conjee or (rice conjee).
Sharbat is a drink made from fruits or petal flowers.
 Paanakam is a drink made from lemon juice or tamarind water, jaggery, dried ginger and cardamom.

Lunch and dinner dishes

Main dishes
 Plain rice

Rice varieties

 Thakkali Soru - Tomato rice, Tomato coconut milk rice
 Sambar Soru - Rice cooked with lentils, vegetables with a glaze of tamarind juice
 Thengai Soru - Coconut rice
 Milagu Soru - Pepper rice
 Paruppu Soru - Lentil rice
 Karuvepillai Soru - Curry leaves rice
 Thayir Soru - Curd rice
 Nei Soru - Ghee rice
 Urulai Soru - Potato rice
 Muttaikos Soru - Cabbage rice
 Kudaimilagai Soru - Capsicum rice
 Kootansoru - Mixed vegetable rice
 Kothamalli Pudina Soru - Corriander and mint rice
 Manga Soru - Mango rice
 Thatta payaru arisi paruppu Soru - Cow pea and lentil rice
 Vetrilai poondu Soru - Betel leaves rice with garlic
 Vaṟutta arici - Fried rice
 Brinji Soru
 Elumichai soru (lemon rice) - A seasoning of onions, tomatoes, curry leaf, red chilly, salt and lemon juice made with rice
 Ghee pongal
 Sweet pongal
 Kalkandu pongal
 Puli pongal - Tamarind pongal
 Thinai pongal - Foxtail millet pongal recipes
 Puliyodarai, is a popular Tamil dish that is a mixture of fried tamarind paste and cooked rice. Fried tamarind paste with sesame oil, asofoetida, fenugreek powder, chilly, groundnuts, chickpea, black gram, mustard seeds, coriander seeds, cumin seeds, 'curry leaves, turmeric powder, jaggery and salt.
 Biryani such as mutton, chicken and veg briyani

Sambar varieties

 Ladiesfinger sambar
 Potato, tomato and carrot sambar
 Carrot and beans sambar
 Arachuvitta sambar
 Bitter gourd pitlai
 Sambar for idly/dosa/pongal
 Mango Sambar 
 Mixed Vegetable Sambar
 Vendhaya Keerai sambar
 Brinjal Sambar
 Onion Arachu vitta Sambar
 Drumstick Sambar Iyer style (without onions)
 Pasi Paruppu Sambar (tiffin sambar)
 No Onion No garlic Carrot Sambar
 Keerai Thandu Sambar
 Mor Sambar/Curd Sambar

Rasam Varieties

 Lemon rasam
 Paruppu rasam (tomato rasam)	
 Cumin rasam
 Garlic rasam	
 Kollu Rasam (horse gram rasam)
 Pepper rasam	
 Pineapple rasam	
 Tomato rasam	
 Neem flower (Veppam Poo) rasam
 Kandathippili (pepper) rasam
 Mint rasam
 Beetroot tomato rasam
 Mutton elumbu rasam/Mutton bone rasam

Kuzhambu (Curry) varieties

 Thatta payiru kathirikkai kozhambu/Cow pea Brinjal curry
 Murunga keerai kozhambu/Drumstick leaves curry
 Pidukkam paruppu kozhambu/Shelled field beans curry
 Kaalan kozhambu/Mushroom curry
 Vendhaya kozhambu/Fenugreek seeds curry
 Mochai kozhambu/Field beans curry
 Pattani kuzhambu/Dry peas curry
 Ennai kathrikkai kozhambu/Oily eggplant spicy curry
 Vendaikkaai kaara kozhambu/Ladies finger spicy curry
 Kathrikkai kaara kozhambu/Brinjal spicy curry
 Mulai payaru kozhambu/Moong sprouts curry
 Ulli theeyal/Onion theeyal curry
 Kadalai theeyal/Channa theeyal curry
 Murungakkai theeyal/Drumstick theeyal curry
 Mochai theeyal/Field beans theeyal curry
 Poondu theeyal/Garlic theeyal curry
 Peerkangaai paal kozhambu/Ridgegourd curry
 Kollu kozhambu/Horse gram curry
 Keera kadaisal/Spinach smash curry
 Avarakkai paruppu kuzhambu/Broad beans lentil curry
 Milagai mandi/Green chilli curry
 Kaaramani puli kozhambu/Black eyed tamarind curry
 Urundai kozhambu/Lentil dumplings curry
 Murungakkai puli kozhambu/Drumstick tamarind curry
 Poondu kozhambu/Garlic tamarind curry
 Poosani paruppu kootu/Pumpkin lentil curry
 Vatha kozhambu/Turkey berry, black night shade curry
 Soya kozhambu/Soya curry
 Sakkarai valli kizhangu kozhambu/Sweet potato curry
 Pavakkaai pitla/Bittergourd curry
 Pavakkaai puli kozhambu/Bitter gourd tamarind curry
 Jeeraga kozhambu/Jeera seeds curry
 Milagu kozhambu/Pepper corns curry
 Karunai kizhangu kozhambu/Yam curry

Poriyal/stir-fry varieties 

 Parangikkaai ellu poriyal/Pumpkin fry curry with sesame seeds
 Arasanikaai poriyal/Yellow pumpkin fry
 Sorakkaai verkaadalai poriyal/Calabash peanuts fry
 Kizhangu pottalam/Madurai potato fry masala
 Senai kizhangu poriyal/Yam roast in banana leaves
 Urulai milagu varuval/Potato pepper fry
 Senai chops/Yam chops
 Vengaaya thalai poriyal/Spring onion fry
 Murungakeerai poriyal/Drumstick leaves fry
 Urulai podimaas/Potato podimas
 Ennai kathrikkaai masala/Stuffed small eggplant oily masala
 Chinna vengaayam poriyal/Shallots fry
 Kaaramani poriyal/Yard long beans fry
 Carrot beans thovaran/Carrot beans in coconut masala fry
 Vendhaya keerai kadalai poriyal/Methi leaves channa fry
 Cheppankizhangu varuval/Arbi fry
 Chettinad urulai poriyal/Chettinad spicy potato fry
 Chettinad urulai pattani poriyal/Chettinad spicy potato peas fry
 Agathi keerai poriyal/Agathi keerai fry
 Avarakkai poriyal/Broad beans coconut fry
 Kovakkai poriyal/Ivy gourd fry
 Carrot kose poriyal/Carrot cabbage fry
 Kaalan milagu varuval/Mushroom pepper fry
 Vendakkaai poriyal/Ladiesfinger fry
 Beetroot poriyal/Beetroot coconut fry
 Chow chow poriyal/Chayote squash fry
 Vaazhakkai podimas/Raw banana fry
 Peerkangaai poriyal/Ridgegourd fry
 Mullangi poriyal/Raddish fry
 Maravalli kizhangu poriyal/Tapioca stir fry
 Thanneer muttaan kizhangu poriyal/Asparagus fry
 Pudalangaai poriyal/Snake gourd fry
 Payaru thovaran/Green gram fry
 Pappaalikkai poriyal/Raw papaya fry
 Vendhaya keerai poriyal/Fenugreek leaves fry
 Kudaimilagaai milagu poriyal/Capsicum pepper fry
 Cauliflower milagu pirattal/Cauliflower pepper fry

Kootu/stew varieties 

 Vaazhaipoo kootu/Plantain flower stew
 Vendakkai kootu/Ladiesfinger stew
 Murungakeerai paruppu usili/Drumstick leaves lentil stew
 Paruppu beans usili/Beans and lentils stew
 Kootaviyal/Aviyal cooked with all country veggies
 Keerai mandi/Chettinad spinach stew
 Sorakkaai kootu/Bottle gourd stew
 Vaazhai thandu kootu/Plantain stem curd stew
 Keerai paruppu poondu kootu/Spinach lentil garlic stew
 Mulakeerai kootu/Amarnath leaves lentil stew
 Pudalangai kootu/Snake gourd stew
 Kothavarangaai kootu/Cluster beans stew
 Poosanikkai kootu/Yellow pumpkin lentil stew
 Manathakkaali keera kootu/Black night shade leaves lentil stew
 Chow chow kootu/Chayote squash stew
 Thakkali kaai kootu/Green tomato lentil stew
 Kathrikkai rasavaangi/Eggplant lentil stew
 Mor keerai kootu/Buttermilk spinach stew
 Muttaikose kootu/Cabbage lentil stew
 Pachai payaru kootu/Moong bean stew
 Poosanikaai mor kootu/Ash gourd curd stew
 Chenaikizhangu kootu/Elephant yam stew
 Kadamba kootu/Mixed vegetable stew
 Noolkol kootu/Kohlrabi stew
 Tirunelveli Sodhi
 Murungakkai kootu/Drumstick lentil stew
 Avarakkaai kootu/Broadbeans lentil stew
 Kathrikka kootu/Brinjal stew
 Sutta kathirkkai Gotsu/Burnt Brinjal stew
 Parangikkaai paal kootu/Pumpkin stew in coconut milk
 Pappaalikkaai kootu/Raw pappaya stew
 Palakkaai kootu/Raw Jackfruit stew
 Vallaarai keerai kootu/Brahmi booti stew

Chicken varieties

 Arachivitta kozhi curry/Chicken in spicy thick coconut gravy
 Varuthu aracha kozhi curry/Chicken in spicy fried and ground coconut gravy
 Kozhi milagu varuval/Chicken pepper fry
 Kozhi vellai kuruma/Chicken in white gravy
 Chicken 65
 Chicken pakora
 Chicken sukka
 Chicken ghee roast
 Kozhi milagu masala/Chicken pepper masala
 Naatu Kozhi kuzhambu/Country chicken curry
 Naatu kozhi rasam/Chicken soup
 Chicken Chinthamani
 Kozhi pachai curry/Chicken corriander and mint curry
 Pallipaalayam chicken fry
 Chicken Kola urundai kozhambu/Chicken dumplings curry
 Madras kozhi kozhambu/Madras chicken curry
 Chicken Chettinad
 Seeraga samba chicken biryani/Chicken biryani cooked with Seeraga samba rice
 Ambur chicken biryani
 Thalapakkatti chicken biryani
 Chicken 65 biryani
 Kovai biriyani

Mutton varieties

 Aatukkal paaya/Mutton trotters stew
 Nenju elumbu soup/Mutton rib bones soup
 Mutton kuzhambu/curry
 Mutton korma in thick coconut gravy 
 Mutton in fried ground coconut gravy
 Mutton elumbu rasam/Mutton bone soup
 Nalli elumbu masala/Goat Bone marrow masala
 Mutton curry dosa
 Ratha poriyal/Goat blood fry
 Mutton Sukka
 Mutton milagu varuval/Mutton pepper fry
 Mutton Kola urundai kozhambu/Muttom dumplings curry
 Kongunaadu vella mutton biryani/Kongunaad White mutton biryani
 Seeraga samba mutton biryani/Mutton biryani cooked with Seeraga samba rice
 Ambur Mutton biryani
 Thalapakkatti Mutton biryani

Seafood varieties

 Meen puli muzham/Fish in thick coconut tamarind gravy
 Meen karutha curry/Fish black curry[in fried coconut, shallots, garlic, dried ginger, peppercorns, corriander seeds, red chillies, oregano and other spices]
 Thengai paal meen curry/Fish in spicy coconut milk gravy.
 Sura puttu/Fishpittu
 Iraal masala/Prawn spicy masala
 Iraal milagu varuval/ Spicy prawn pepper fry
 Coconut fish fry
 Nethili meen curry/White bait/anchovies curry
 Nethili meen varuval/Spicy deep fried anchovies
 Prawn ghee roast
 Fish briyani
 Prawn briyani
 Meen maanga curry/ Fish mango curry
 Spicy chettinad prawn masala
 Fish curry in ginger and coconut milk
 Spicy Vanjaram fry/Spicy salmon fry
 Chettinad fish curry
 Nandu masala/Crab curry
 Nandu omelette/Crab omelette
 Nandu rasam/Crab soup
 Chippi appam - an appetizer made with curried rice flour and oysters. This is a favorite among the Muslim population in the Kanyakumari District.

Egg varieties

 Muttai thokku/Egg masala
 Muttai aviayal/Egg aviyal
 Muttai milagu varuval/Egg pepper fry
 Chettinad spicy egg curry
 Muttai paniyaaram/Egg Paniyaaram
 Odachi oothina muttai curry/ Egg poached curry
 Muttai kalakki/Egg Kalakki
 Muttai korma
 Egg in thick coconut milk gravy
 Egg in spicy coconut and tamarind gravy
 Udachu vitta Mutta Kaara Kuzhambu
 Mutta kuzhambu

Sweet dishes

 Arisi thengai payasam/Rice coconut pudding
 Pasiparuppu paaysam/Moong dhal pudding
 Kadalai paruppu paayasam/channa dhal pudding
 Aval paayasam/Puffed rice pudding
 Khasa khasa paayasam/Poppy seeds pudding
 Vazhai pazha paayasam/Banana pudding
 Adai Paayasam/Cooked rice flakes pudding
 Paal Paayasam/Milk pudding
 Thengai Paayasam/Coconut pudding
 Pala pazha Paayasam/Jackfruit pudding
 Mampazha paayasam/Mango pudding
 Javvarisi paaysam/Tapioca sago pudding
 Samba godhumai paayasam/Cracked wheat pudding
 Semiya paayasam/Vermicelli pudding
 Thinai paaysam/Foxtail millet pudding
 Carrot paayasam/Carrot pudding
 Badam paayasam/Badam pudding
 Rice paayasam/Rice pudding
 Sorakkai paayasam/Calabash pudding
 Elaneer paaysam/Tender coconut pudding
 Brown rice kheer
 Sweet potato kheer
 Apple kheer
 Thengai bholi/Coconut bholi
 Paasi paruppu bholi/Moong dhal bholi
 Then mittai/Honey comb sweet
 Ingi marappa/Ginger fudge
 Pori urundai/Puffed rice jaggery balls
 Kadalai mittai/Peanut jaggery balls
 Maalaadu/Roasted channa dhal sweet balls
 Paasi paruppu laddu/Moong dhal sweet balls
 Ravalaadu/Rava sweet balls
 Thinai laddu/Fox millet sweet balls
 Godhumai laddu/Wheat sweet balls
 Raagi nilakadalai laddu/Raagi peanut balls
 Ellurundai/Black sesame seeds sweet balls
 Vella elluruandai/White sesame seeds sweet balls
 Coconut laddu/Coconut sweet balls
 Aval laddu/Poha sweet balls
 Sweet somas
 Suyyam
 Kadharppam
 Mangaadi/Sweet mango in jaggery stew
 Sakkapalathirattu/Jack fruit in jaggery stew
 Thirattu paal/Paalguva
 Palambali/Kongunaadu style rice pudding
 Apppam
 Nei appam
 Unni appam
 Ammini appam
 Adhirasam
 Aravanai
 Paal kozhukattai
 Pazham Paniyaram
 Sakkarai kozhukattai
 Sakkarai Pongal/Sweet pongal
 Aval pongal
 Kalkandu pongal/Sugar candy pongal
 Sweet seedai
 Puttamudhu
 Mundhiri Kothu
 Akkaravadisal
 Jangiri
 Rava Kesari
 Pineapple kesari
 Mango kesari
 Aval kesari
 Halwa varieties - thirunelveli halwa, ashoka halwa, jackfruit halwa, wheat halwa, pineapple Halwa.

Traditional snacks
 Murukku
 Seedai
Bajji
 varieties of Mixture
 Kara Sev
 Pakoda
    bonda
 types of vadai (ulundhu, Kara, aamai) 
 Thattu vadai/nippetu'
 Boondhi
.Kara pori
  aval pori

Pickles
 Elumichanga oorkaai/Lemon pickle
 Poondu oorkaai/Garlic pickle
 Ingi oorkaai/Ginger pickle
 Thakkali oorkaai/Tomato pickle
 Vengaaya oorkaai/Onion pickle
 Mangaa oorkaai/Mango pickle
 Nellikaai oorkaai/Gooseberry pickle
 Naarthangaai oorkaai/Citron pickle
 Carrot oorkaai
 Milaga oorkaai - Green Chilly pickle
 Red Chilli pickle
 Sun dried tomato pickle
 Maavadu
 Mor Milgai/Sun dried big chillies
 Puli ingi/ Ginger tamarind pickle

Podi varieties/chutney powder
These are the dry chutney powder varieties to be mixed with cooked plain rice and ghee.

 Paruppu podi/Lentil chutney powder
 Poondu podi/Garlic chutney powder
 Idly milagu podi/ Idly chutney powder as a side dish for idly and dosas
 karuveppilai podi/Curry leaves chutney powder
 Milagu podi/Pepper chutney powder
 Ellu podi/Sesame seeds chutney powder
 Kollu podi/Horse gram chutney powder
 Nilakadalai podi/Groundnut chutney powder
 Kothamalli podi/Corriander chutney powder
 Mint chutney powder
 Raw banana chutney powder for infants and toddlers

See also
 Tamil
 Cuisine of India
Cuisine of Pondicherry

References

Further reading
 Ammal, Meenakshi, S., The Best of Samaithu Paar: The Classic Guide to Tamil Cuisine: Penguin Books India
 DeWitt, Dave and Nancy Gerlach. 1990. The Whole Chile Pepper Book. Boston: Little Brown and Co.

External links
 Boston.com - A new year's feast from Tamil Nadu

 
Culture of Chennai
Cuisine
 
Vegetarian dishes of India
Vegetarian dishes of Sri Lanka
South Indian cuisine
Desi cuisine
Indian cuisine by state or union territory